Streptomyces pluripotens is a bacterium species from the genus of Streptomyces which has been isolated from mangrove soil from the Tanjung Lumpur river in Malaysia.

See also 
 List of Streptomyces species

References

Further reading

External links
Type strain of Streptomyces pluripotens at BacDive -  the Bacterial Diversity Metadatabase	

pluripotens
Bacteria described in 2014